Steven Cheung Chi-hang is a Hong Kong singer and actor. Steven Cheung was a member of the Cantopop duo, Sun Boy'z from 2002 to 2006, where William Chan joined in and the group was renamed Sun Boy'z. It was officially disbanded in December 2008.

Biography

Early life and career
Cheung was born into a wealthy family in Hong Kong to a Dutch mother and a Chinese father.

Cheung never had academic talent. He failed badly in school and repeated the same grade level three times before dropping out.

From his father's connection, Steven and his younger brother Ryan Chung became models for Jamcast. He was later referred into Emperor Entertainment Group, while his sister, Jan Chung became a member of the music duo Krusty. 

Cheung began his career in the entertainment industry as one-half of the duo Boy'Z with Kenny Kwan in 2002–2005. When Kwan left Boy'Z in January 2005, Cheung continued the duo with Dennis Mak. In June 2006, William Chan joined Boy'Z and the group was renamed as Sun Boy'z (With "Sun" being a parody of the Cantonese pronunciation of "new"). Cheung continued to lead the group until it was disbanded in 2008.

In 2003, Cheung started filming movies with Kenny Kwan and has appeared in a string of low budget movies including, The Death Curse, Bug Me Not!, The Haunted School and A Chinese Tall Story.

In 2009, Cheung and Kenny Kwan started collaborating again under the name Boy'Z.

Filmography
The Death Curse (2003)
Fantasia (2004)
Papa Loves You (2004)
New Police Story (2004) [cameo]
6 AM (2004)
Bug Me Not! (2005)
Moments of Love (2005)
A Chinese Tall Story (2005)
49 Days (2006)
Isabella (2006)
The Knot (China 2006)
McDull, The Alumni (2006) (cameo)
Goodbye...Luisa (2006)
Twins Mission (2007)
The Haunted School (2007)
Super Fans (2007)
Yes, I Can See Dead People (2008)
A Decade of Love (2008)
All's Well, Ends Well 2009 (2009)
The Jade and the Pearl (2010)
Lan Kwai Fong (2011)
The Midas Touch (2013)
Monkey King – The Five Fingers Group (2019)
Second Generation Master (2019)
The Love of Immortal (2019)

Television series
All About Boy'z
Hearts Of Fencing [cameo]
Sunshine Heartbeat [cameo]
Kung Fu Soccer
Life Off Stage
Supreme Fate [Steven@Boy'z]
Star City
Til Love Do Us Lie (2011)
Joyous Marshal
Sniper Standoff (2013) as Energy On
Never Dance Alone (2014) as Luke Mo
Brother's Keeper II (2016) as Piscine Ko
Flying Tiger II (2020) as Ryan Lee

Discography
As Boy'Z:

2003:
 LaLa 世界
 LaLa 世界 (第二版)
 一起喝采
 A Year to Remember (AVEP)
2004:
 A Year To Remember (3rd Version)
 Boy'zone 男生圍
 Boy'zone (Version 2)
 Boy'z Can Cook
 Joy to the World Christmas Hits (Box Set with Twins, Yumiko Cheng and Isabella Leong)
2005:
 星Mobile超時空接觸演唱會
 八星報囍賀賀囍 (CD with Twins, Yumiko Cheng, Isabella Leong, Deep Ng and Don Li)
2006
 Sun Boy'z – Sun Boy'z (EP)
 Say Goodbye [Isabella Leong ft. Steven Cheung]
2007
 Sun Boy'z – All For 1
 Sun Boy'z – First Date (初次約會)
2011
 Boy'z – Ready to Go

References

External links
Official Site (EEG Artist Page)
Steven's Personal Blog

Boyz Malaysia Fan Club

Sun Boy'z members
Hong Kong people of Dutch descent
Hong Kong male singers
1984 births
Living people
Hong Kong idols